Batrachosuchus is a genus of temnospondyl that existed from the Early to Middle Triassic of southern Africa (Ntawere Formation of Zambia and Burgersdorp Formation of South Africa) and the Blina Shale of Australia.

Species 
Three species have been described:
 Batrachosuchus browni 
 Batrachosuchus concordi 
 Batrachosuchus henwoodi

References

Further reading 
Wildlife of Gondwana: Dinosaurs and Other Vertebrates from the Ancient Supercontinent (Life of the Past) by Pat Vickers Rich, Thomas Hewitt Rich, Francesco Coffa, and Steven Morton

Brachyopids
Induan first appearances
Olenekian life
Anisian life
Triassic temnospondyls of Africa
Triassic South Africa
Fossils of South Africa
Fossils of Zambia
Triassic temnospondyls of Australia
Fossils of Australia
Fossil taxa described in 1903